Dehak (also known as Dehak-e Dowlatābād, Dowlatābād, Dowlatābād Dehak, and Dowlat Abad-e Sarvestan) is a village in Bid Zard Rural District, in the Central District of Shiraz County, Fars Province, Iran. At the 2006 census, its population was 2,272, in 586 families.

References 

Populated places in Shiraz County